Frederik of Baden (9 July 1455 – 24 September 1517 in Lier) was a bishop of Utrecht from 1496 to 1517.

Frederick of Baden was the son of margrave Charles I of Baden-Baden and Catherine of Austria, sister of Frederick III, Holy Roman Emperor.

He was canon at Cologne before he was elected as bishop of Utrecht through heavy pressure from Maximilian I, Holy Roman Emperor. The Emperor hoped that Frederik, as a full nephew, would be favourable to Habsburg interests in the bishopric of Utrecht.

The states of Utrecht, however, were on an independent course and approached Duke Charles of Guelders. Frederick attempted to act strongly, but the faction-struggles became too much for him.

When it was revealed in 1514 that he was planning to relinquish the bishopric to a candidate of King Louis XII of France, he lost the support of Charles V, Holy Roman Emperor, who forced him to resign on 9 May 1517. Charles then managed to get Philip of Burgundy elected.

After his death, Frederick was interred in the church of Baden-Baden.

Prince-Bishops of Utrecht
1455 births
1517 deaths
16th-century Roman Catholic bishops in the Holy Roman Empire
Sons of monarchs